Calamus nambariensis is a species of flowering plant in the family Arecaceae. It is found in Burma, Laos, Vietnam, Thailand, Nepal, Bhutan, Bangladesh, the Assam region of India and the Yunnan region of China.

The natural habitat of Calamus nambariensis is subtropical or tropical moist lowland forests. It is threatened by habitat loss.

References

nambariensis
Flora of Myanmar
Flora of Laos
Flora of Vietnam
Flora of Thailand
Flora of Nepal
Flora of Bhutan
Flora of Bangladesh
Flora of Yunnan
Flora of India (region)
Flora of Assam (region)
Flora of China
Plants described in 1908
Critically endangered plants
Taxa named by Odoardo Beccari
Taxobox binomials not recognized by IUCN